State Route 477 (SR 477), also known as Cummins Mill Road, is a  state highway in Jackson County, Tennessee. It connects SR 290 in Bloomington Springs with SR 135 near Dodson Branch, and it provides access to Cummins Falls State Park.

Route description
SR 477 begins at an intersection with SR 290 in Bloomington Springs.  The highway travels to the northeast. About half-way between its termini, it passes Cummins Falls State Park. SR 477 crosses over the Blackburn Fork River and proceeds in a northeasterly direction until it meets its eastern terminus at an intersection with SR 135.

Major intersections

See also

References

477
Transportation in Jackson County, Tennessee